Claude Vandersleyen (26 September 1927 – 7 December 2021) was a Belgian Egyptologist.

Biography
After his secondary studies at the Collège Cardinal Mercier, Vandersleyen earned a degree in Egyptology at the Université libre de Bruxelles in 1950. He became a professor of Egyptian art and the Egyptian language at the Université catholique de Louvain. He assisted in the restoration of the Tempest Stele, discovered by French archeologist from 1947 to 1951.

Vandersleyen died in Braine-l'Alleud on 7 December 2021, at the age of 94.

Publications
Chronologie des préfets d'Égypte de 284 à 395 (1962)
Les guerres d'Amosis, fondateur de la XVIIIe dynastie (1971)
"Des obstacles que constituent les cataractes du Nil" (1971)
Das Alte Ägypten (1975)
L'Égypte et la vallée du Nil, vol. II : De la fin de l'Ancien Empire à la fin du Nouvel Empire (1995)
La guerre de Ramsès II contre les Hittites. Der Hettiterkrieg Ramses'II. Réédition du texte allemand (Vienne, 1939) et traduction française de Claude Vandersleyen (1996)
Ouadj Our. Un autre aspect de la vallée du Nil (1999)
"Le relief d’Amenhotep Ier au Louvre B 58 = E 11278" (2004)
Iahmès Sapaïr fils de Séqénenré (XVIIe dynastie) (2005)
"Où est mort le grand Pompée, l’adversaire malheureux de Jules César ?" (2006)
Le delta et la vallée du Nil. Le sens de ouadj our (wȝd wr) (2008)
Écrits sur l'art égyptien. Textes choisis, réunis et édités par Nadine Cherpion et A.-L. Oosthoek (2012)
Le Rapport d’Ounamon (vers 1065 avant Jésus-Christ) : Analyse d’une mission manquée (2013)

References

1927 births
2021 deaths
Belgian Egyptologists
People from Brussels
Academic staff of the Université catholique de Louvain